Oleksandra Ustinova is a Ukrainian politician. She is a member of the Verkhovna Rada and the faction leader of the Holos political party.

Education
Ustinova completed a master of political science at the National University of Kyiv-Mohyla Academy. She studied at Stanford University.

Career
In 2019, Ustinova was a member of the center for combating corruption and the secretary of the National Anti-Corruption Bureau of Ukraine public oversight board.

In June 2019, Ustinova and Lesia Vasylenko joined the Holos political party. She became the faction leader of the Holos political party on 17 December 2021, succeeding .

During the 2022 Russian invasion of Ukraine, Ustinova spoke to the United States House of Representatives in Washington, D.C. On 28 February 2022, she stated it is likely she will have to give birth while still in the United States. On 2 March 2022, Ustinova expressed disappointment about the 2022 State of the Union Address.

References 

Living people
Year of birth missing (living people)
Ninth convocation members of the Verkhovna Rada
21st-century Ukrainian women politicians
Place of birth missing (living people)
Voice (Ukrainian political party) politicians
National University of Kyiv-Mohyla Academy alumni
Stanford University alumni
Women members of the Verkhovna Rada